Reinhart Klemens Maurer (born 1935) is a philosopher and professor from Xanten, Germany.

Maurer studied philosophy, German and English at the universities of Münster, Kiel and Vienna. In 1964, he made his Ph.D. Maurer later wrote his post-doctoral research (Habilitation) in 1969 at the University of Stuttgart under the supervision of Robert Spaemann. Between 1962 and 1975, he was a research assistant and then a lecturer at the Institute for Philosophy and Pedagogy at the University of Stuttgart and from 1975 to 1997, he served as a professor at the Institute for Philosophy (Institut für Philosophie) at the Free University of Berlin (Freie Universität Berlin).

Maurer was influenced by Ritter's concept of a practical philosophy that challenges concrete problems, in the tradition of the ancient European and the classical philosophy. This was his approach in his works about Plato, Hobbes, Hegel, Habermas and the critical theory. He applies critical theory on the modern, techno-democratic worldview, and ties it with fundamental critique on the modern society (Nietzsche, Heidegger, Arnold Gehlen and Gómez Dávila).

Publications (in German)
 Hegel und das Ende der Geschichte, Stuttgart 1965, 2nd enlarged edition, Freiburg 1980.
 Platons „Staat“ und die Demokratie. Historisch-systematische Überlegungen zur Politischen Ethik, Berlin 1970.
 Revolution und „Kehre“. Studien zum Problem gesellschaftlicher Naturbeherrschung, Frankfurt a. M. 1975.
 Jürgen Habermas' Aufhebung der Philosophie, Tübingen 1977.
 Joachim Ritters Praktische Philosophie. In: Mark Schweda, Ulrich von Bülow (eds.): Entzweite Moderne. Zur Aktualität Joachim Ritters und seiner Schüler, Göttingen 2017, 63-84.
 Joachim Ritter und die Philosophie der Nachkriegszeit. In: Information Philosophie 4/2018, 30-41.

External links
 Website

1935 births
Living people
20th-century German philosophers
People from Xanten
People from the Rhine Province
German male writers